Irons in the Fire is the third studio album by American singer-songwriter Teena Marie, released on August 14, 1980 by Motown. Her first self produced effort, it was dedicated to her father, Thomas Leslie Brockert (1919-1976). It received positive reviews on its release. In a 2009 interview she named it as her personal favourite of all her albums.

Reception

Irons in the Fire peaked at #9 on the Black Albums chart and #38 on the Pop Albums chart. Lead single "I Need Your Lovin'" peaked at #9 on the US Black Singles chart and became her first Top 40 hit on the Billboard Hot 100, peaking at  #37.  It also reached #28 in the United Kingdom, making it Marie's second and last top 30 single in that country.  In addition, along with the track "Chains", "I Need Your Lovin'" peaked at number two for two weeks on the dance charts. "Young Love" was released as the album's second single, peaking just outside the top 40 on the US Black Singles chart.

Track listing 
All songs were written by Teena Marie, except where noted.

 "I Need Your Lovin'" – 7:31
 "Young Love" – 5:29
 "First Class Love" – 5:06
 "Irons in the Fire" – 3:33
 "Chains" – 7:11
 "You Make Love Like Springtime" – 4:59
 "Tune in Tomorrow" (Mickey Hearn, Marie) – 6:26
 "You Make Love Like Springtime (Reprise)" – 3:26
Bonus tracks - 2011 Expanded Edition
 "You Make Love Like Springtime (Reprise)" (Extended) – 5:23 (replaces track 8)
 "I'm A Sucker For Your Love' (Live)" – 8:35
 "I Need Your Lovin' (Live)" – 5:31
 "Someday We'll All Be Free (Live)" – 2:26
 "Deja Vu (Live)" – 10:38
 "Square Biz (Live)" – 6:29

Personnel 
James S. Stewart, Jr. – Piano, Electric Piano
David Taylor, Greg Hargrove, Wali Ali – Electric Guitar
Nick Brown – Acoustic Guitar
Michael Boddicker – Synthesizer
Bobby Lyle – Piano
Allen McGrier, James Jamerson – Bass
Paul Hines, Earl Palmer – Drums
Paulinho da Costa – Percussion, Congas
Thomas "T" Bumpass – Trumpet, Flugelhorn
William Carroll White, Jr. – Alto Saxophone
Ray C. Woodard – Tenor Saxophone
Lloyd Lindroth – Harp
Jill Jones, Mickey Hearn, Shirley Mattison, Ozone – Backing Vocals
Paul Riser – string arrangements

Technical
Bobby Brooks – engineer
Ginny Livingston, Johnny Lee – art direction
Ron Slenzak – photography

Charts

Weekly charts

Year-end charts

Singles

Covers
In 2000, pop singer Sheena Easton covered "I Need Your Lovin'" as a bonus track on her retro Disco covers album Fabulous for the Japanese market.
The Cover Girls, Lisa Lisa and Cult Jam and Curiosity Killed the Cat have also covered the song.

References

External links
 Teena Marie-Irons In The Fire at Discogs

Teena Marie albums
1980 albums
Albums arranged by Paul Riser
Gordy Records albums